Opium War is a 2008 Afghan black comedy film directed by Golden Globe winner, Siddiq Barmak. The film was shot entirely in Afghanistan and revolves around the experiences of two American soldiers (Peter Bussian and Joe Suba), who crash their helicopter in the Afghan desert and find themselves at the mercy of the natural elements and an eclectic family of Afghan opium farmers.

In order to create a realistic setting of an opium poppy field, Barmak had to obtain permission from the Afghan government to plant the crop because growing opium poppies was declared illegal in Afghanistan in 2002. Several challenges were faced by the filmmakers, with regards to the poppy field, before filming was completed. Most notably, Afghan poppy eradication teams attempted to destroy his film set twice and the lack of rain forced Barmak to drill a well for irrigation as well as to bring in water tankers from as far away as 30 km.

The film was Afghanistan's official submission to the 2009 Academy Awards. Opium War was screened at several international film festivals, including the 2008 edition of Rome Film Festival, where it won the Golden Marc’Aurelio Critics’ Award for Best Film.

References

External links
 

2008 films
Dari-language films
Films shot in Afghanistan
Films set in Afghanistan
War in Afghanistan (2001–2021) films
2008 black comedy films
Afghan comedy films
Films about opium
2000s English-language films